Coco Chanel is a 2008 biographical drama television film directed by Christian Duguay and written by Ron Hutchinson, Enrico Medioli and Lea Tafuri. It stars Shirley MacLaine as (the older) Coco Chanel, the pioneering French fashion designer. MacLaine was nominated for a Golden Globe Award, an Emmy and a Screen Actors Guild Award for her work in the film.

Although an Italian-French-British production backed by Rai Uno and France 2, Coco Chanel was primarily intended for the US market, and was first broadcast in the United States on 13 September 2008 by cable channel Lifetime. It premiered in Italy on 5 October 2008 and in France on 29 December 2008. In the United Kingdom, it was first released on DVD, on 6 June 2011. Its first British TV broadcast was on True Entertainment on 7 April 2014.

Main cast
 Shirley MacLaine as Coco Chanel (elder)
 Barbora Bobuľová as Coco Chanel (young)
 Robert Dawson as Lord Fry
 Olivier Sitruk as Arthur "Boy" Capel
 Marine Delterme as Émilienne d'Alençon
 Anny Duperey as Madame Desboutins
 Cosimo Fusco as Albert
 Valentina Lodovini as Adrienne  (young)
 Maggie Steed as Adrienne  (elder)
 Malcolm McDowell as Marc Bouchier
 Jean-Claude Dreyfus as Paul Poiret
 Sagamore Stévenin as Étienne Balsan
 Cécile Cassel as Gabrielle Dorziat
 Brigitt Christensen as Tsarina Alexandra of Russia
 Vincent Nemeth as Jacques Doucet (fashion designer)

Home video release
On 7 July 2009, Coco Chanel was released on DVD in the Region 1 (US) format.

Awards and nominations
Golden Globe Award
Best Actress – Miniseries or Television Film (MacLaine, nominated)

Screen Actors Guild (SAG)
Outstanding Female Actor – Miniseries or Television Film (MacLaine, nominated)

61st Primetime Emmy Awards
Outstanding Made for Television Movie (Nominated)
Outstanding Lead Actress in a Miniseries or a Movie (MacLaine, nominated)

References

External links
 Official website
 
 Coco Chanel on Rai.it

2008 in fashion
2008 television films
2008 films
2008 biographical drama films
Biographical television films
British biographical drama films
Cultural depictions of Coco Chanel
Drama films based on actual events
English-language French films
English-language Italian films
Films about fashion designers
Films directed by Christian Duguay (director)
French biographical drama films
French television films
Italian biographical drama films
Italian television films
Lifetime (TV network) films
2008 drama films
2000s English-language films
2000s British films
2000s French films
British drama television films